Thomas Pledl (born 23 May 1994) is a German professional footballer who plays as a midfielder for  club Waldhof Mannheim.

Club career
Pledl went through the renowned youth ranks of TSV 1860 Munich before leaving the club in 2012 to join Greuther Fürth. For Greuther Fürth he made his Bundesliga debut in November of the same year, as a substitute for Felix Klaus in a 2–0 defeat to Hannover 96.

In January 2015, after two and half years with Fürth, he moved to fellow 2. Bundesliga club FC Ingolstadt 04 who were battling for promotion to the Bundesliga at that time. He signed a contract for four and half years until 2020. He was loaned to SV Sandhausen on 16 January 2016.

On 10 April 2019, Fortuna Düsseldorf confirmed that Pledl would join the club from the 2019–20 season. He penned a two-year contract.

On 15 January 2023, Pledl signed with Waldhof Mannheim.

Honours
Individual
 Fritz Walter Medal U18 Silver: 2012

References

External links

1994 births
Footballers from Bavaria
People from Regen (district)
Sportspeople from Lower Bavaria
Living people
German footballers
Germany youth international footballers
Association football midfielders
SpVgg Greuther Fürth players
FC Ingolstadt 04 players
SV Sandhausen players
FC Ingolstadt 04 II players
Fortuna Düsseldorf players
Fortuna Düsseldorf II players
SV Waldhof Mannheim players
Regionalliga players
Bundesliga players
2. Bundesliga players